Prosopalpus saga, the branded dwarf skipper, is a butterfly in the family Hesperiidae. It is found in Guinea, Ivory Coast, Ghana, Cameroon, western Uganda, north-western Tanzania and possibly western Kenya. The habitat consists of forests.

Adults have been recorded feeding on nectar from Lantana flowers.

References

Butterflies described in 1937
Erionotini